This is a listing of the horses that finished in either first, second, or third place and the number of starters in the Breeders' Cup Filly & Mare Sprint, a Grade One race run on dirt on Friday of the Breeders' Cup World Thoroughbred Championships.

See also 

 Breeders' Cup World Thoroughbred Championships

References 
 Breeders' Cup official website

Filly and Mare Sprint
Lists of horse racing results